The Codex Mariendalenis is a manuscript on vellum containing the epic poem Yolanda vu Veianen or Yolanda of Vianden. It is believed to be the work of Brother Hermann von Veldenz  who probably wrote the story of Yolanda's life in 1290 after her death in 1283. The work consists of 5,963 lines of rhyming couplets in Moselle Franconian which bears close similarities to today's Luxembourgish. It is therefore of particular interest to those tracing the history of the Luxembourgish language.

History
Brother Hermann's epic appears to have lain in the Marienthal monastery for almost four centuries after he wrote it. In 1655, the original was copied on paper by the Belgian Jesuit, Alexander von Wiltheim. At the same time, Wiltheim wrote a life of Yolanda in Latin based on Brother Hermann's Middle High German. Then in November 1999, the Luxembourg linguist Guy Berg and Yasmin Krull discovered the original Codex in Ansembourg Castle, a short distance from the monastery at Marienthal.

The poem tells how Princess Yolanda gave up the comforts of her home in Vianden Castle to join the Convent of Marienthal where she later became the prioress. See further details under Yolanda of Vianden.

Acquisition by the Luxembourg National Archives 

References

Sources
 Berg, Guy: "Der Codex Mariendalensis: Zu Wiederauffindung, Erschließung und Edition einer hochmittelalterlichen Handschrift aus dem Raume Luxemburg." In: Section de linguistique, d'ethnologie et d'onomastique de l'Institut Grand-ducal (ed.): Bulletin linguistique et ethnologique, fasc. 30 (2001), pp. 7–26.
 Moulin, Claudine: "Bruder Hermanns 'Yolanda von Vianden'. Zur Erschließung und textgetreuen Edition des neuaufgefundenen Codex Mariendalensis", in: ebda, pp. 39–45.

Medieval Luxembourg
Luxembourgian literature
Luxembourgish language
14th-century manuscripts